Ace Attorney is a 2016 anime television series based on Capcom's Ace Attorney video game series. The series follows rookie defense attorney Phoenix Wright as he stands in court to defend clients accused of murder, aided by his spirit medium assistant, Maya Fey. The series is directed by Ayumu Watanabe at A-1 Pictures, with screenplay by Atsuhiro Tomioka and character design by Keiko Ōta and Koji Watanabe. The series aired on NNS across Japan between April 2, 2016, and September 24, 2016, replacing Kindaichi Case Files R in its initial timeslot. The series was simulcast by Crunchyroll, who offer multiple subtitle tracks featuring both the original Japanese names and localized English names, and is distributed on home video in North America by Funimation. A second season by CloverWorks aired from October 6, 2018, to March 30, 2019, with a simulcast by Crunchyroll and a dubbed version streamed by Funimation.

Episode list

Season 1

Season 2

Media release
In Japan, the series received a home media release by Aniplex. The first box set was released on DVD and Blu-ray on August 24, 2016, and includes the first thirteen episodes and Vol. 1 of the series' original soundtrack. The second box set was released on December 21, 2016, and includes episodes 14-24 and Vol. 2 of the series' soundtrack.

Notes

References

External links
  
 

Ace Attorney
Ace Attorney